TRX1 may refer to:
 TRX1, an identifier for MLL (gene)
 TRX1, an identifier for Thioredoxin
 TRX1, an immune-related disease treatment developed by Tolerx